Gregory Fuller Kite (born August 5, 1961) is an American retired professional basketball player. Kite was a member of two NBA Championship teams with the Boston Celtics in 1984 and 1986. Kite played eleven NBA seasons.

Early life
Kite was the youngest of four siblings with a brother and two sisters. He first played team basketball when he was 10 years old at the Southwest YMCA in Houston, while also playing other sports. He attended Pershing Junior High, where he played basketball in grades seven through nine.

Kite attended Madison High School in Houston, Texas, under Coach Lee Tynes. Kite was 6′10” by the time he was 15, and had given up other sports.

Basketball Weekly ranked Madison as high as 5th in the nation in 1979 and 1st in Texas. With a record of 39–0, Madison lost in the state semifinals to Lufkin High School from Austin, Texas. Kite averaged 18 points and 15 rebounds as a senior.

Kite was selected to play in the 1979 McDonald's All-American Game, alongside players such as Sam Bowie, Antoine Carr, Quintin Dailey, Sidney Green, Clark Kellogg, Sidney Lowe, John Paxson, Ralph Sampson, Byron Scott, Steve Stipanovich, Isiah Thomas, Dereck Whittenburg, Dominique Wilkins and James Worthy.

College career
Kite was recruited by Duke, Kentucky and UCLA among others. Family connections led to him attending Brigham Young University, where he played for coach Frank Arnold.

Kite was a sophomore on the 1980-1981 BYU team that finished 25-7 under Coach Frank Arnold. Playing alongside future Celtic teammates Danny Ainge and Fred Roberts, Kite averaged 8.3 points, 8.5 rebounds and 1.2 assists as the Cougars defeated Princeton, UCLA and Notre Dame in the 1981 NCAA Division I Basketball Tournament, before losing to Ralph Sampson and Virginia in the East Regional Final. Kite had 12 points and 11 rebounds in the win over UCLA.

Kite averaged 6.4 points and 7.6 rebounds in 112 games over his four-year college career.

Professional career
Kite was selected 21st overall by the Boston Celtics in the 1983 NBA draft. Said Kite about the draft: "That summer the Celtics traded Rick Robey to the Phoenix Suns for Dennis Johnson and a first round pick. What that did was open up a spot for a backup center. Red Auerbach really wanted to pick Roy Hinson from Rutgers. Hinson was a heck of a player who ended up having some knee problems later on, and Roy had really long arms like Kevin McHale. He could reach four or five inches higher than I could, even though he was only 6′-9”. So Red really wanted him and hoped he would last until the Celtics could pick, but Roy was selected by Cleveland. I was the alternative."

As a Celtic, he won two championship rings in 1984 and 1986, serving as a reserve center behind Hall of Famers Robert Parish, Larry Bird, and Kevin McHale.

On June 7, 1987 in game three of the 1987 NBA Finals, with Robert Parish in foul trouble and Bill Walton ailing, Kite was called upon by Coach KC Jones to match up against Kareem Abdul-Jabbar for 22 minutes. He responded with defense that tired Jabbar, and blocked a shot by Magic Johnson. Kite had zero points, nine rebounds, two assists, one block, and five fouls in his 22 minutes and his play helped the Celtics to a 109-103 victory.

"Kite didn't score a point?" Laker Coach Pat Riley asked after the game. "It looked like he had 100."

After the game, Larry Bird said,  "I've seen Greg play real well at times. He's got limited offensive ability, but he is a banger and he is probably our hardest worker. He kept Kareem off balance and got a lot of rebounds. His work ethic finally paid off. He stayed with his game and did a real good job."

Kite played five seasons with Boston, until he was waived on February 1, 1988.

“My time in Boston was incredible, unique. I played with Larry, Kevin, Dennis Johnson. I loved New England, made a lot of friends there. It was a great time, great era." Kite recalled. "We went into the 87-88 season and Bird, McHale were getting pretty banged up. They brought in Artis Gilmore and put me on injured reserve, even though I wasn’t injured. You can always have a bad back.”

Kite then played for the Los Angeles Clippers and five other NBA teams, including 12 games with the Charlotte Hornets in that team's inaugural season of 1988-89.

“When I went to the Celtics I wanted to play, but there were four Hall of Famers there. I stuck around after practice to work on my game and there were other veterans on the team who would do that, too." Kite said. “When I left the Celtics, yes, I was able to play more, but when you go from a championship team to a team like the Clippers, who were one of the worst teams back then, you can develop some bad habits. You didn’t see anyone sticking around after practice there.”

With the Sacramento Kings on January 6, 1990, Kite made the only 3-pointer of his career against the Portland Trail Blazers. Kite shot 1 of 6 from three for his career. "I led the league in three-point shooting one year. I was 1-for-1 shooting threes for the Sacramento Kings. So I quit while I was ahead." Kite said of his three.

Kite played for the Orlando Magic between 1990 and 1994.  In his first season with the team, he started all 82 games at center and led the Magic with 7.2 rebounds and 1.0 blocked shots per game, both career highs.  He served as backup to Shaquille O'Neal in his final two seasons in Orlando.  Kite finished the 1992–93 season playing with the Rapid City Thrillers of the Continental Basketball Association (CBA). He was brought back to Orlando on a veterans' minimum contract. Kite finished his NBA career with the Knicks and Pacers in 1995.

Kite played 680 games in eleven NBA seasons, starting 225 of them. He averaged 2.5 points, 2.3 fouls and 3.8 rebounds in 14 minutes per game. Kite played for the Boston Celtics (1983-1988), Los Angeles Clippers (1988-1989), Charlotte Hornets (1989), Sacramento Kings (1989-1990), Orlando Magic (1990-1994), New York Knicks (1995) and the Indiana Pacers (1995).

“With my skills and ability, I was a backup,” Kite said. “I played 12 years and played until I was 35. I wanted it to last longer. It would’ve been great to play my whole career in Boston.”

Post-playing career
Currently residing in Central Florida, Kite is commissioner of the Florida Basketball Association, while also working as a financial adviser.

In 1997, Kite served as an interim assistant basketball coach at his alma mater, Brigham Young University.

Personal life
Kite and his wife Jennifer have 10 adopted children.

NBA career statistics

Regular season

|-
| style="text-align:left;background:#afe6ba;"| †
| align="left" | Boston
| 35 || 1 || 5.6 || .455 || – || .313 || 1.8 || .2 || .0 || .1 || 1.9
|-
| align="left" | 
| align="left" | Boston
| 55 || 4 || 7.7 || .375 || – || .688 || 1.6 || .3 || .1 || .2 || 1.6
|-
| style="text-align:left;background:#afe6ba;"| †
| align="left" | Boston
| 64 || 2 || 7.3 || .374 || .000 || .385 || 2.0 || .3 || .0 || .4 || 1.3
|-
| align="left"| 
| align="left" | Boston
| 74 || 1 || 10.1 || .427 || .000 || .382 || 2.3 || .4 || .2 || .6 || 1.7
|-
| align="left" | 
| align="left" | Boston
| 13 || 0 || 6.6 || .391 || – || .167 || 1.8 || .2 || .2 || .6 || 1.5
|-
| align="left" | 
| align="left" | L. A. Clippers
| 40 || 19 || 24.4 || .456 || .000 || .534 || 6.0 || 1.1 || .4 || 1.3 || 5.1
|-
| align="left" | 
| align="left" | L. A. Clippers
| 58 || 12 || 12.6 || .405 || – || .452 || 3.3 || .5 || .4 || .8 || 1.9
|-
| align="left" | 
| align="left" | Charlotte
| 12 || 12 || 17.8 || .533 || – || .600 || 4.4 || .6 || .3 || .7 || 3.2
|-
| align="left" | 
| align="left" | Sacramento
| 71 || 47 || 21.3 || .432 || 1.000 || .500 || 5.3 || 1.1 || .4 || .7 || 3.2
|-
| align="left"  | 
| align="left" | Orlando
| style="background:#CFECEC; width:1em"|82* || style="background:#CFECEC; width:1em"|82* || 27.1 || .491 || – || .512 || 7.2 || .7 || .3 || 1.0 || 4.8
|-
| align="left" | 
| align="left" | Orlando
| 72 || 44 || 20.5 || .437 || .000 || .588 || 5.6 || .6 || .4 || .8 || 3.2
|-
| align="left" | 
| align="left" | Orlando
| 64 || 1 || 10.0 || .452 || .000 || .542 || 3.0 || .2 || .2 || .2 || 1.4
|-
| align="left" | 
| align="left" | Orlando
| 29 || 0 || 10.7 || .371 || – || .364 || 2.4 || .1 || .1 || .4 || 1.2
|-
| align="left" | 
| align="left" | New York
| 2 || 0 || 8.0 || .000 || – || – || 2.0 || .0 || .0 || .0 || .0
|-
| align="left" | 
| align="left" | Indiana
| 9 || 0 || 6.8 || .214 || – || .200 || 2.0 || .1 || .0 || .0 || .9
|- class="sortbottom"
| style="text-align:center;" colspan="2"| Career
| 680 || 225 || 14.8 || .438 || .167 || .486 || 3.8 || .5 || .2 || .6 || 2.5

Playoffs

|-
| style="text-align:left;background:#afe6ba;" | 1984†
| align="left" | Boston
| 11 ||  || 3.5 || .125 || – || .833 || .8 || .3 || .0 || .1 || .6
|-
| align="left" | 1985
| align="left" | Boston
| 9 || 0 || 7.0 || .417 || – || .500 || 1.8 || .3 || .1 || .0 || 1.2
|-
|style="text-align:left;background:#afe6ba;" | 1986†
| align="left" | Boston
| 13 || 0 || 6.0 || .700 || – || .571 || 1.5 || .2 || .2 || .3 || 1.4
|-
| align="left" | 1987
| align="left" | Boston
| 20 || 1 || 8.6 || .350 || – || .429 || 2.3 || .4 || .1 || .4 || .9
|-
| align="left" | 1995
| align="left" | Indiana
| 8 || 0 || 3.3 || .333 || – || 1.000 || .9 || .0 || .1 || .0 || .5
|-
|- class="sortbottom"
| style="text-align:center;" colspan="2"| Career
| 61 || 1 || 6.2 || .396 || – || .625 || 1.6 || .3 || .1 || .2 || .9

References

External links
Historical Player Profile at NBA.com
Greg Kite at Basketball-Reference.com

1961 births
Living people
American men's basketball players
Basketball players from Houston
Boston Celtics draft picks
Boston Celtics players
BYU Cougars men's basketball players
Centers (basketball)
Charlotte Hornets players
Fort Wayne Fury players
Indiana Pacers players
McDonald's High School All-Americans
New York Knicks players
Orlando Magic players
Parade High School All-Americans (boys' basketball)
Rapid City Thrillers players
Sacramento Kings players